Opal Butterfly was an English psychedelic rock band from Oxfordshire, that was active between 1968 and 1970. Although the band itself did not gain widespread success, the musicians did go on to conduct successful musical careers. The band featured Simon King (drums) and for a short time, Lemmy, who later joined Hawkwind. Further members were Robert "Robbie" Milne (lead guitar), Allan Love (lead vocals), Richard Bardey (bass), and Tommy Doherty (rhythm guitar). The band released three official singles of the heavy psychedelic rock style before disbanding.

History
Before becoming Opal Butterfly, the group was known as Cardboard Heaven They were formed in 1967 in Oxfordshire. Their original lineup consisted of Roger Warner (bass) Robbie Milne (lead guitar) 17-year-old Simon King (drums) Alan Cobb (keyboards) and vocals shared by Stuart Thornhill and Denny Sutcliffe. Locally, they performed at clubs and dance halls with a repertoire of R&B and blues standards. Even though the group garnered a considerable following, Simon King would leave the group to form Opal Butterfly.

Opal Butterfly 
Later in the year Simon King formed his new band and recruited Milne on Guitar. The remaining lineup were associates of the two and included Allan Love (vocals) Richard Bardey (bass) Tom Doherty (guitar) Regarding the name, Doherty stated "Butterfly by itself was a bit dull, so we thought of something more colorful".

The group began recording demos and received the interest of CBS Records. These included covers of "I Had Too Much to Dream (Last Night)" and "Wind Up Toys", both tracks by The Electric Prunes.
In 1968, the band released their first official recording "Beautiful Beige"/"Speak Up" which was described as a solid piece of harmonial psychedelic pop, but made no impactful gains. The group's most notable recordings came in 1969 with an organ-backed cover/remake of The Who composition "Mary Anne With The Shaky Hand" with the B-side being "My Gration Or?". Despite radio play, the single only gained them local support and the band would revamp its lineup and change labels to Polydor. Most notably, the band acquired Lemmy Kilmister.
Kilmister met the band at a shop called The Chelsea Drug Store located in the Kings Rd Chelsea. He started a friendship with King who then asked him to join, and Kilmister would be a member until the group's decision to kick him a few months later. With the new label, the new lineup released a single, "Groupie Girl"/"The Gigging Song". For this final effort, the band returned to its roots as the songs were more blues influenced in nature. However, the single caused a slight uproar when the cover featured a nude woman and radio stations refused to play the single. Throughout 1969 into 1970 the band initiated a tour in Britain for sets of 90 minutes. They appeared in the Derek Ford film, Groupie Girl (1970), as "Sweaty Betty". Lemmy did not contribute to any recordings or the film. One last line-up change was formed but did not change the band's fortunes and they broke up in 1970. Kilmister and King would cooperate once again in Hawkwind.

In the meantime, Milne formed another Opal Butterfly line-up with replacement musicians, namely Ray Owen (vocals) David O'List (guitar), Stan Decker (bass) and Mike Burchett (drums) but this line-up only lasted a short while. Doherty and King formed their own version of Opal Butterfly and were not too pleased of Milne forming his own version, so in 1969 Milne joined the 'New Look Soul Band' who were later to become Fine China.

Discography
? - "I Had Too Much to Dream (Last Night)" (Mantz, Tucker) b/w "Wind-Up Toys" (demo) 
1968 - "Beautiful Beige" b/w "Speak Up" (CBS single)
1968 - "Mary Anne with the Shaky Hand" (Townshend) b/w "My Gration Or?" (single)
1969 - "Groupie Girl" b/w "The Gigging Song" (Polydor single)
1970 - Groupie Girl (soundtrack album, featured the two single tracks) Polydor 2383 031

References

External links
Stevelitchfield.com
Biography
Groupie Girl album cover

Musical groups established in 1967
Musical groups disestablished in 1970
English psychedelic rock music groups
Musical groups from London